Beijing Juvenile Offender Detachment is a prison in the municipality of Beijing, China.

See also
List of prisons in Beijing municipality

References

Laogai Research Foundation Handbook

Prisons in Beijing
1995 establishments in China
Youth detention centers